Margherita Rinaldi (born 12 January 1935) is an Italian lyric soprano, primarily active in the 1960s and 1970s.

Rinaldi was born in Turin, Italy, and completed her music studies in Rovigo. She won a voice competition in Spoleto and made her debut there in 1958 in the title role of Lucia di Lammermoor. Her debut at La Scala in Milan came the following year as Sinaide in Rossini's Mosè in Egitto. Rinaldi sang at most of the major opera houses in Italy, in roles such as Amina in La sonnambula, Adina in L'elisir d'amore, Norina in Don Pasquale and especially Gilda in Rigoletto. She also excelled in operas by Mozart and Cimarosa.

Rinaldi won acclaim as Giulietta in Claudio Abbado's version of Bellini's I Capuleti e i Montecchi, opposite Giacomo Aragall and Luciano Pavarotti, at La Scala in 1966, and also as Linda in a revival of Linda di Chamounix again at La Scala, in 1972, opposite Alfredo Kraus. She sang a wide variety of roles for RAI between 1963 and 1975, such as Bertha in Le Prophète, Cleopatra in Giulio Cesare, Ginevra in Ariodante, and Noraime in Les Abencérages. She recorded La Traviata with Pavarotti in Dublin in 1964.

In 1977 she had a triumph singing Amenaide in Rossini's Tancredi opposite Horne at Teatro dell'Opera in Rome. The night was broadcast by RAI TV.
In 1978, Rinaldi appeared as Adalgisa in a production of Bellini's Norma at the Teatro Comunale in Florence.  Conducted by Riccardo Muti and starring Renata Scotto in the title role, these performances offered the Florentine public a rare chance to hear a lyric soprano as the younger, more vulnerable character of Adalgisa, according to the composer's intention. In November of the same year Rinaldi sang Ines in Meyerbeer's L'Africaine at the Royal Opera, Covent Garden, opposite Plácido Domingo and Grace Bumbry.

Rinaldi also enjoyed a successful international career, making her American  debut at the Dallas Opera as Gilda in 1966. Her debut at the San Francisco Opera was as Lucia in 1968. She also sang at the  Lyric Opera of Chicago. Rinaldi also performed at the Glyndebourne, Wexford and Bregenz festivals.

Rinaldi made only two commercial opera recordings, Gilda in Rigoletto opposite Rolando Panerai and Franco Bonisolli, which was also the soundtrack of a German television production, and Ilia in Idomeneo with Sir Colin Davis conducting.  Luckily, unofficial "pirate" recordings have preserved several of her live performances: the Spoleto Lucia di Lammermoor, the Scala I Capuleti e i Montecchi and Linda di Chamounix, the RAI Le Prophète, a 1967 Rigoletto from Turin, and the 1978 Norma from Florence. She also recorded two Bach cantatas, Nos 51 and 199, with Antonio Janigro and the Angelicum Orchestra of Milan for Ricordi that was licensed by the American Musical Heritage Society and issued as MHS 889.

Margherita Rinaldi was also an excellent performer of sacred music: she performed at La Scala Rossini's Petite Messe Solennelle or for RAI TV Mozart's Vesperae solennes de confessore. She took part in the first recording of Rossini's Messa di gloria (1974).

Margherita Rinaldi retired from the stage in 1981. She lives outside Florence where she privately coaches young singers.

References

 Roland Mancini and Jean-Jacques Rouveroux,  (orig. H. Rosenthal and J. Warrack, French edition), Guide de l’opéra, Les indispensables de la musique (Fayard, 1995).

External links
 Margherita Rinaldi

1935 births
Italian operatic sopranos
Living people
Musicians from Turin
20th-century Italian women opera singers